East 172nd Avenue station is a MAX light rail station in Gresham, Oregon. It serves the Blue Line and is the 19th stop eastbound on the eastside MAX line. The MAX system is owned and operated by TriMet, the major transit agency for the Portland metropolitan area.

The station is at the intersection of East Burnside Street and NE/SE 172nd Avenue. This station has staggered side platforms, which sit on either side of the cross street, because the route runs around this station on Burnside Street in the median.

The station was located in TriMet fare zone 3 from its opening in 1986 until September 2012, at which time TriMet discontinued all use of zones in its fare structure.

References

External links
Station information (with westbound ID number) from TriMet
Station information (with eastbound ID number) from TriMet
MAX Light Rail Stations – more general TriMet page

MAX Light Rail stations
MAX Blue Line
Buildings and structures in Gresham, Oregon
1986 establishments in Oregon
Railway stations in the United States opened in 1986
Railway stations in Multnomah County, Oregon